The House-Museum of Leopold and Mstislav Rostropovich is a national memorial/museum in Baku, Azerbaijan.

History

The house-museum of Leopold and Mstislav was created in 1998 in the building where the Rostropovich family lived during its stay in Baku from 1925-1931. Leopold Rostropovich was invited to Baku in 1925 from Orenburg by the Azerbaijani composer Uzeyir Hajibeyov. Leopold Rosrtopovich accepted the invitation and the whole family moved to Baku where he and his wife began teaching at the Azerbaijani State Conservatory. 

On March 27th 1927 the cellist, pianist and conductor Mstislav Rostropovich was born in this house. The street where the museum is now located bears the name of the father of the son Rostropovich. The museum was opened to visitors in 2002.
Mstislav Rostropovich himself was present during the museum’s opening ceremony with his wife Galina Vishnevskaya and a lot of guests.

Structure

At present, the main collection of the House-museum contains more than 5000 exhibits. Among the exhibits are many items that belonged to the Rostropovich family. In the house there is a carpet and furniture from the late 19th century to early 20th century. The exhibition also contains photographs, letters, autographs, concert tailcoat, conductor’s baton, gramophone records, awards and other artifacts.
The museum consists of four rooms and a hallway. Part of the hallway and the first room bear memorial character. All of the rooms of the museum are devoted to the creativity M.Rostropovich and specific periods in his life.

References

Biographical museums in Azerbaijan
Museums in Baku
Birthplaces of individual people